Japan participated in the 2010 Asian Games in Guangzhou, China on 12–27 November 2010.

Canoeing

Canoe-Kayak Flatwater 

Men

Women

Canoe-Kayak Slalom 

Men

Women

Cricket

Women
Team
Erina KanekoYuka YoshidaShizuka MiyajiAtsuko SudaYuko SaitoAyako IwasakiKurumi OtaAyako NakayamaMariko YamamotoMiho KannoEma KuribayashiShizuka KubotaFuyuki KawaiYuko KunikiErika Ida

Group round

Pool B

Semifinals

Bronze medal match

Cue Sports

Cycling

BMX 

Men

Women

Mountain Bike 

Men

Women

Road 

Men

Women

Track 
Sprints

Pursuits

Keirin

Time Trial

Points races

Dancesport

Standard dance

Latin dance

Diving 

Men

Women

Dragon boat

Men

Equestrian

Dressage

Eventing

Jumping

Fencing

Men

Women

Football

Men
Team
Takuya MasudaYuki SanetoJun SonodaTakefumi TomaYusuke HigaShoma KamataRyohei YamazakiKazuya YamamuraMasato KurogiKota MizunumaKensuke NagaiShunya SuganumaDaisuke SuzukiShohei OtsukaKeigo HigashiHotaru YamaguchiKyohei NoborizatoShunsuke AndoMasato KudoTakamitsu Tomiyama

Pool matches

Group A

1/8 finals

Quarter-finals

Semi-finals

Final

Women
Team
Nozomi YamagoAzusa IwashimizuKyoko YanoYukari KingaAya SameshimaMizuho SakaguchiMegumi KamionobeAya MiyamaAyako KitamotoHomare SawaShinobu OhnoAyumi KaihoriSaki KumagaiMami YamaguchiKana OsafuneNahomi KawasumiManami NakanoMegumi Takase

Pool matches

Group B

Semi-finals

Final

Golf

Men

Women

Gymnastics

Artistic gymnastics 
Men
Individual Qualification & Team all-around Final

Individual

Women
Individual Qualification & Team all-around Final

Individual

Rhythmic gymnastics 

Individual Qualification & Team all-around Final

Individual all-around

Trampoline 

Men

Women

References

Nations at the 2010 Asian Games
2010
Asian Games